England vs New Zealand in rugby league is a rivalry between the England national rugby league team and the New Zealand national rugby league team in the sport of rugby league. The first test match between the two sides was in 1975, with a 17–17 draw being the result.

New Zealand also played England in a tour match in 1908, however that isn't counted as a test match and is noted as so below.

Head to Head

Results

1900s

1970s

2000s

2010s

References

External links 

 England vs New Zealand – Rugby League Project

Rugby league rivalries
England national rugby league team
New Zealand national rugby league team
Sports rivalries in New Zealand